Axial is an extinct town in Moffat County, in the U.S. state of Colorado. The GNIS classifies it as a populated place.

A post office called Axial was established in 1890, and remained in operation until 1958. The community's central location near the "axis" of mining activity caused the name to be selected.

References

Ghost towns in Colorado
Geography of Moffat County, Colorado